This article displays the rosters for the participating teams at the 2005 FIBA Africa Club Championship for Women.

Abidjan Basket Club

Arc-en-Ciel

Djoliba

First Bank

ISPU

Primeiro de Agosto

Radi

Somo BB

References

External links
 2012 FIBA Africa Champions Cup Participating Teams

FIBA Africa Women's Clubs Champions Cup squads
Basketball teams in Africa
FIBA
FIBA